St Peter Julian's Church is a Roman Catholic church and shrine of eucharistic adoration in Sydney in the care of the Congregation of the Blessed Sacrament. 

The church is located at 641 George Street, Haymarket, in the heart of Chinatown. Designed by Terence Daly, it was completed in early 1964, it is named after the congregation's founder, St Peter Julian Eymard, who was canonised in 1962.

A religious community of priests and brothers (currently under the leadership of Fr Joe Fernando SSS]) live in the monastery attached to St Peter Julian's Church.

History
The Congregation of the Blessed Sacrament arrived in Australia in 1929 to assume pastoral care of St Francis' Church, Melbourne, creating a eucharistic shrine  there. Seeking to establish a similar shrine in Sydney, they acquired land in 1952 and built a monastery and city chapel, originally named the Church of the Blessed Sacrament, opened by Cardinal Gilroy on 30 August 1953. The community grew rapidly, necessitating the construction of a new monastery in 1963 and a new church in 1964. Both underwent a major refurbishment and modernisation in 2008–09.

See also 

Catholic Church in Australia

References

External link
 

Roman Catholic churches in Sydney
1953 establishments in Australia
Christian organizations established in 1953
Roman Catholic churches completed in 1964
Haymarket, New South Wales
20th-century Roman Catholic church buildings in Australia